Zodarion hauseri is a spider species found in Greece and Bulgaria.

See also 
 List of Zodariidae species

References 

hauseri
Spiders of Europe
Spiders described in 1984